The pink Ralph Lauren dress of Gwyneth Paltrow was designed by Ralph Lauren and worn to the 71st Academy Awards on 21 March 1999 at the Dorothy Chandler Pavilion in Los Angeles. The dress received mixed reviews and the style was compared to that of the actress Grace Kelly. The dress was widely copied after the event, and Paltrow was credited for bringing pink back into fashion.

Design
The actress was accompanied to the event by her parents. Paltrow received an Academy Award for Best Actress for her portrayal of Viola De Lesseps in the film Shakespeare in Love. The soft pink gown designed by Ralph Lauren was made of taffeta, and has a relatively simple design. The dress has a long, wide skirt and a bodice with straps and V-shaped neckline; a scarf of the same color was tied to it. Ralph Lauren adapted the dress from a pink taffeta skirt that Paltrow wanted to wear from a Ralph Lauren lookbook. With her dress, Paltrow wore pink Manolo Blahnik strappy sandals and Harry Winston jewelry: a diamond necklace, bracelet and earrings valued at around $160,000. Her father, Bruce Paltrow, purchased the jewelry for her as a present after she won the Academy Award for Best Actress. Gwyneth Paltrow later wore the jewelry, in her father's memory, at her 2018 wedding to Brad Falchuk.

Reception
Fashion critics were initially divided in opinion regarding Paltrow's choice of dress. TV Guide.com tells how one critic described the actress as "a Barbie doll wrapped in a satin ribbon." One commentator called it "incongruous with the current fashion", but "suitable Gwyneth Paltrow". The actress revived the fashion of pale pink and her selection of Ralph Lauren proved to be well received by the public and was widely emulated. An owner of a teen apparel boutique in Westport, Connecticut remarked, "The year before, I wouldn't have even looked at anything pink. It would have reminded my customers of when they were little girls. Paltrow made the color cool. And Paltrow's Oscar dress turned into the number one prom dress style of the year thanks to ABS and Allen Schwartz, who is famous for making low-priced copies of Oscar dresses."

See also
 List of individual dresses

References

1990s fashion
Outfits worn at the Academy Awards ceremonies
1999 clothing
Ralph Lauren, Paltrow
Gwyneth Paltrow